This is a list of people from Timișoara, Romania (included in the list are natives as well as permanent and/or temporary residents).

Arts

Architecture 
 Ferenc Reitter (1813–1874), architect and engineer
 Aladár Árkay (1868–1932), architect, craftsman and painter
 Ernő Foerk (1868–1934), architect
 Károly Kós (1883–1977), architect, writer, graphic artist, ethnographer and politician

Comics 
 André François (1915–2005), cartoonist

Literature and poetry 
 Pelbartus Ladislaus (1430–1504), Franciscan writer and preacher 
 Osman Ağa (1670–1725), military officer and autobiographer
 Ioan Slavici (1848–1925), writer and journalist; he attended the German-language high school in Timișoara
 Franz Xaver Kappus (1883–1966), military officer, journalist, editor and writer
 Miloš Crnjanski (1893–1977), writer and diplomat; he grew up in Timișoara
 Camil Petrescu (1894–1957), playwright, novelist, philosopher and poet; he taught at the Higher School of Commerce in Timișoara
 Wilhelm Stepper-Tristis (1899–?), novelist, journalist and literary critic
 Ezra Fleischer (1928–2006), poet and philologist
 Petre Stoica (1931–2009), poet and translator; he attended high school in Timișoara
 Ana Blandiana (b. 1942), poet, essayist and civil rights activist
 Șerban Foarță (b. 1942), writer; he lives in Timișoara
 Dorin Tudoran (b. 1945), poet, essayist, journalist and dissident
 Ioan Mihai Cochinescu (b. 1951), novelist and essayist
 Richard Wagner (b. 1952), novelist; he lived in Timișoara
 Herta Müller (b. 1953), novelist, poet, essayist and recipient of the 2009 Nobel Prize in Literature; she lived in Timișoara
 George Șerban (1954–1998), journalist, writer and politician; he lived in Timișoara
 Brîndușa Armanca (b. 1954), journalist and teacher

Painting 
 Pavel Petrović (1818–1887), painter
 Ludwig Michalek (1859–1942), painter, graphic artist and engraver
 Julius Podlipny (1898–1991), painter, drawer and teacher; he lived in Timișoara
 Diet Sayler (b. 1939), painter and sculptor
 Bogdan Achimescu (b. 1965), visual artist

Sculpture 
 Ingo Glass (b. 1941), sculptor

Business 
 Meir Amigo (18th century), businessman, philanthropist and community leader; he lived in Timișoara
 Adam F. Poltl (1891–1969), businessman and politician
 Francesco Illy (1892–1956), inventor of espresso machine and founder of illy
 Ovidiu Tender (b. 1956), businessman
 Florentin Banu (b. 1967), businessman

Clergy 
 Augustin Pacha (1870–1954), first bishop of the Roman Catholic Diocese of Timișoara
 Adalbert Boros (1908–2003), auxiliary bishop of the Roman Catholic Diocese of Timișoara
 Sebastian Kräuter (1922–2008), bishop of the Roman Catholic Diocese of Timișoara
 Martin Roos (b. 1942), bishop of the Roman Catholic Diocese of Timișoara
 László Tőkés (b. 1952), pastor and politician; he was an assistant pastor in Timișoara

Entertainment

Film, theatre and television 
 Aleksa Bačvanski (1832–1881), actor and theatre director
 Silviu Stănculescu (1932–1998), actor
 Robert Dornhelm (b. 1947), film and television director
 Julieta Szönyi (b. 1949), actress
 Andrei Ujică (b. 1951), screenwriter and film director
 Florin Călinescu (b. 1956), actor, theatre director, TV host and politician
 Hanno Höfer (b. 1967), film director, producer and musician
 Dan Negru (b. 1971), TV presenter and host
 Mile Cărpenișan (1975–2010), war correspondent
 Anca Miruna Lăzărescu (b. 1979), film director and screenwriter
 Alexandru Potocean (b. 1984), actor

Music 
 Franz Limmer (1808–1857), composer and conductor; he lived in Timișoara
 Ion Ivanovici (1845–1902), military band conductor and composer
 Margaret Matzenauer (1881–1963), mezzo-soprano
 Zeno Coste (1907–1985), singer
 Charles Bruck (1911–1995), conductor
 Johanna Martzy (1924–1979), violinist
 Cornel Trăilescu (1926–2019), opera composer and conductor
 Francisco Kröpfl (1931–2021), composer and music theorist
 Ferdinand Weiss (1932–2002), pianist
 Hugo Jan Huss (1934–2006), conductor and music director
 Ervin Acél (1935–2006), conductor
 Ioan Holender (b. 1935), operatic baritone and the longest-serving director of the Vienna State Opera
 Nicu Covaci (b. 1947), soloist and guitarist of Phoenix
 Eugen Gondi (b. 1947), jazz drummer
 Mircea Baniciu (b. 1949), vocalist and guitarist of Pasărea Colibri
 Bujor Hoinic (b. 1950), composer, conductor and teacher
 Adrian Bărar (1960–2021), vocalist and guitarist of Cargo
 Aura Twarowska (b. 1967), mezzo-soprano; soloist of the Timișoara National Opera between 1997 and 2010
 Carmen Șerban (b. 1971), singer
 Pacha Man (b. 1975), hip-hopper
 Cristian Măcelaru (b. 1980), conductor

Military 
 Pippo Spano (1369–1426), condottiero and merchant; ispán of Temes County between 1404 and 1424
 János Hunyadi (1407–1456), general and governor of Hungary; ispán of Temes County from 1441
 Pál Kinizsi (1432–1494), general; ispán of Temes County between 1478 and 1494
 György Dózsa (1470–1514), nobleman, soldier of fortune and leader of the Dózsa Rebellion of 1514; he was tortured and executed after unsuccessfully attempting to besiege the Timișoara Fortress
 Sava Temišvarac ( 1594–1612), vojvoda
 Eugene of Savoy (1663–1736), field marshal; liberator of Timișoara from the Ottoman occupation (1716)
 Claude Florimond de Mercy (1666–1734), field marshal; first governor of the Banat of Temeswar
 Ernő Kiss (1799–1849), lieutenant general and one of the 13 Martyrs of Arad
 György Klapka (1820–1892), general
 Hermann Kövess von Kövessháza (1854–1924), last commander-in-chief of the Austro-Hungarian Army
 Theodore Maly (1894–1938), priest and intelligence officer

Politics 
 Charles Robert (1288–1342), King of Hungary and Croatia; he moved his residence to Timișoara between 1316 and 1323
 Danilo Stefanović (1815–1886), Prime Minister of Serbia
 Vincențiu Babeș (1821–1907), lawyer, teacher, publicist and politician; he attended the German-language high school in Timișoara
 Carol Telbisz (1853–1914), lawyer, mayor of Timișoara and advisor to the Hungarian Royal Court
 Lucian Georgevici (1875–1940), lawyer and mayor of Timișoara
 Ferenc Marschall (1887–1970), politician
 Sorin Bottez (1930–2009), philologist, politician and diplomat
 Viorel Oancea (b. 1944), major general and mayor of Timișoara
 Gheorghe Ciuhandu (b. 1947), building engineer and mayor of Timișoara
 Mona Muscă (b. 1949), philologist and politician; she attended the University of Timișoara
 Anton Anton (b. 1949), engineer and politician
 Nicolae Robu (b. 1955), computer scientist and mayor of Timișoara
 Slavoliub Adnagi (b. 1965), politician
 Marius Lazurca (b. 1971), diplomat
 Dominic Fritz (b. 1983), conductor and mayor of Timișoara

Scholars 
 Alfred von Domaszewski (1856–1927), historian
 Gyula Pikler (1864–1937), philosopher of law
 Arnold Hauser (1892–1978), art historian and sociologist
 Károly Kerényi (1897–1973), philologist and father of Greek mythology studies
 George Călinescu (1899–1965), literary critic and historian, writer, publicist and academician; he taught at the C.D. Loga High School in Timișoara
 Viorel Cosma (1923–2017), musicologist, lexicographer, music critic and teacher
 Myriam Yardeni (1932–2015), historian
 Andrei Markovits (b. 1948), political scientist and sociologist

Sciences 
 János Bolyai (1802–1860), mathematician and father of non-Euclidean geometry; he did his military service at the Austrian garrison in today's Liberty Square
 Pavel Vasici-Ungureanu (1806–1881), physician
 Traian Lalescu (1882–1929), mathematician; he taught at the Polytechnic Institute of Timișoara
 Dimitrie Leonida (1883–1965), energy engineer; he taught at the Polytechnic Institute of Timișoara
 Jovan Hadži (1884–1972), zoologist
 Victor Vâlcovici (1885–1970), mechanician and mathematician; he taught at the Polytechnic Institute of Timișoara
 Constantin Cândea (1887–1971), chemist; he worked in Timișoara
 Constantin C. Teodorescu (1892–1972), engineer; he taught at the Polytechnic Institute of Timisoara
 Constantin Dinculescu (1898–1990), energy engineer; he taught at the Polytechnic Institute of Timișoara
 Remus Răduleț (1904–1984), electrical engineer; he attended the Polytechnic Institute of Timișoara
 Ioan Vlădea (1907–1976), engineer; he studied and taught at the Polytechnic Institute of Timișoara
 Constantin Avram (1911–1987), structural engineer; he lived in Timișoara
 Caius Iacob (1912–1992), mathematician; he taught at the Polytechnic Institute of Timișoara
 Erwin Ringel (1921–1994), psychiatrist, neurologist and founder of the International Association for Suicide Prevention
 Victor Mercea (1924–1987), nuclear physicist
 Marianne Fillenz (1924–2012), neuroscientist
 Zvi Laron (b. 1927), endocrinologist; he attended the Institute of Medicine of Timișoara
 Alexandru Balaban (b. 1931), chemist
 Coleta de Sabata (1935–2021), engineer; she lived in Timișoara
 Peter Freund (1936–2018), theoretical physicist
 Peter L. Hammer (1936–2006), mathematician
 Karl Fritz Lauer (1938–2018), phytopathologist and herbologist; he studied and worked in Timișoara
 Păun Otiman (b. 1942), agronomist and economist; he lives in Timișoara
 Alexandru Moisuc (b. 1942), agronomist
 Gheorghe Benga (b. 1944), physician and molecular biologist
 George Lusztig (b. 1946), mathematician
 Traian V. Chirilă (b. 1948), chemist; he studied in Timișoara
 Valeriu Tabără (b. 1949), agronomist and politician; he lives in Timișoara
 Tudor Ratiu (b. 1950), mathematician
 Adrian Ioviță (b. 1954), mathematician
 Paul Pîrșan (b. 1956), agronomist; he lives in Timișoara
 Titu Andreescu (b. 1956), mathematician
 Laura Baudis (b. 1969), particle astrophysicist
 Adrian Constantin (b. 1970), mathematician
 Cosmin Alin Popescu (b. 1974), environmental scientist; he lives in Timișoara

Sports

Fencing 
 Andre Spitzer (1945–1972), fencing master and coach, one of the 11 athletes and coaches killed by terrorists in the Munich massacre

Football 
 Ștefan Kovács (1920–1995), football player and coach
 Abraham Klein (b. 1934), football referee
 Zoltán Meskó (b. 1986), American football punter

High jump 
 Iolanda Balaș (1936–2016), Olympic high jumper

Mountaineering 
 Horia Colibășanu (b. 1977), mountain climber

Swimming 
 Johnny Weissmuller (1904–1984), Olympic swimmer, water polo player and actor

Tennis 
 Edina Gallovits (b. 1984), tennis player

References 

People from Timișoara
Timisoara